Stanislav Petrovich Zavidonov (14 October 1934 – 28 December 2021) was a Russian football coach and player. Zavidonov died on 28 December 2021, at the age of 87.

References

External links
 

1934 births
2021 deaths
People from Kansk
Soviet footballers
Association football midfielders
FC Zenit Saint Petersburg players
Soviet football managers
ASM Oran managers
FC Zenit Saint Petersburg managers
Soviet expatriate football managers
Expatriate football managers in Algeria
Soviet expatriate sportspeople in Algeria